Inauguration of Bill Clinton may refer to: 

First inauguration of Bill Clinton, 1993
Second inauguration of Bill Clinton, 1997

See also